Unified Socialist Party (in French: Parti Socialiste Unifié) is a political party in Burkina Faso. PSU was founded in 2001, following a split from the Burkinabè Socialist Party (PSB).

The party was led by Benoît Lompo.  Lompo died October 30, 2007. PSU is part of the United Burkinabé Opposition (OBU) and the Socialist Alliance (together with the People's Movement for Socialism / Federal Party). However, the decision of the Socialist Alliance to support Dr. Emile Paré in the 2005 presidential elections has strained the relations between PSU and OBU.  The party was unsuccessfully in 2007, 2012, and 2015 assembly elections.

References

Political parties in Burkina Faso
Socialist parties in Burkina Faso